The 1932 Chattanooga Moccasins football team was an American football team that represented the University of Chattanooga (now known as the University of Tennessee at Chattanooga) in the Dixie Conference and the Southern Intercollegiate Athletic Association (SIAA) during the 1932 college football season. In its second year under head coach Scrappy Moore, the team compiled a 3–6 record.

Schedule

References

Chattanooga
Chattanooga
Chattanooga Mocs football seasons
Chattanooga Moccasins football